Elia Island is an island in Guinea-Bissau. It is located on the right bank of the Cacheu River close to its mouth in the Atlantic Ocean. The islands's western end lies east of the confluence with the Elia River with Ongueringao Island on the other bank. Its maximum elevation is 5 m and its length 10.5 km

See also
List of islands of Guinea-Bissau

References

External links
Airplane crash near the island
Islands of Guinea-Bissau